Cyanocorax is a genus of New World jays, passerine birds in the family Corvidae. The generic name is derived from the Greek words κυανος (kuanos), meaning "dark blue," and κοραξ (korax), meaning "raven".

It contains several closely related species that primarily are found in wooded habitats of Mexico and Central and South America, with the green jay just barely entering the United States.

The genus Cyanocorax was introduced by the German zoologist Friedrich Boie in 1826, with the plush-crested jay as the type species.

Species
The genus contains 17 species:

Some ornithologists treat the green jay and the Inca jay as conspecific, with C. yncas luxuosus as the green jay and C. yncas yncas as the Inca jay.

References

External links

 
Bird genera
Higher-level bird taxa restricted to the Neotropics
Taxa named by Friedrich Boie